The 2022 Speedway European Championship season was the 10th season of the Speedway European Championship (SEC) era, and the 22nd UEM Individual Speedway European Championship. It was the ninth series under the promotion of One Sport Lts. of Poland. Mikkel Michelsen was the defending champion having won the title in 2021.

The title was won by Denmark's Leon Madsen after he overtook former series leader Janusz Kołodziej in the final round to win by just one point. It was the second time Madsen won the title after claiming the championship in 2018.

Qualification 
For the 2022 season, 15 permanent riders were joined at each SEC Final by one wildcard and two track reserves.

Defending champion, Mikkel Michelsen from Denmark was automatically invited to participate in all final events, while Leon Madsen, Patryk Dudek, Piotr Pawlicki Jr. and Dan Bewley secured their participation in all final events thanks to being in the top five of the general classification in the 2021 season.

Five riders qualified through the SEC Challenge, while David Bellego, Kai Huckenbeck, Václav Milík, Oliver Berntzon and Janusz Kołodziej were named as series wildcards.

Qualified riders

Calendar

Qualification 
The top five riders from the SEC Challenge qualified for the championship series.

Championship Series 
The 2022 series was be staged over four rounds.

Final Classification

See also 
 2022 Speedway Grand Prix

References

External links 

2022
European Championship
Speedway European Championship
Speedway European Championship